Alfred Peter Hillier (1858, Stroud, Gloucestershire – 24 October 1911) was a Conservative MP for Hitchin.

His father Peter was a bacon factor and miller and with his wife Mary lived at Noades House, Shortwood, Near Nailsworth, Gloucestershire. Hillier's continued as a Bacon curers in Nailsworth until the mid 1980's

Hillier spent a large portion of his life in South Africa, where he moved at the age of 16. He obtained a Bachelor of Arts degree at the University of the Cape of Good Hope, and served as a trooper during the Ninth Xhosa War of 1877–1879.

He qualified as a doctor at the University of Edinburgh. He returned to South Africa, and set up a medical practice there. He was imprisoned and fined for alleged involvement in the Jameson Raid.

He returned to Britain, and became involved in Unionist politics. After failing to be elected for Stockport in 1900 and for Luton in 1906, he won Hitchin from the Liberals in January 1910, and was re-elected in December 1910.

Hillier committed suicide in 1911, dying at home, 20, Eccleston Square, Westminster. At the inquest a verdict of "suicide while temporarily insane" was returned. He left an estate valued for probate at £8,428.

Sources

1858 births
1911 suicides
British politicians who committed suicide
Suicides by sharp instrument in England
Politicians from Gloucestershire
People from Stroud District
Conservative Party (UK) MPs for English constituencies
Suicides in Westminster
19th-century British military personnel
University of South Africa alumni
Alumni of the University of Edinburgh
1911 deaths
British military personnel of the 9th Cape Frontier War